Apaurusheya (Sanskrit: अपौरुषेय, lit. means "not of a man"), meaning "not of human" or "impersonal, authorless", is a term used to describe the Vedas, the earliest scripture in Hinduism.

Apaurusheya shabda ("impersonal words, authorless") is an extension of apaurusheya which refers to the Vedas and numerous other texts in Hinduism. 

Apaurusheya is a central concept in the Vedanta and Mimamsa schools of Hindu philosophy. These schools accept the Vedas as svatah pramana ("self-evident means of knowledge"). The Mimamsa school asserts that since the Vedas are composed of words (shabda) and the words  are composed of phonemes, the phonemes being eternal, the Vedas are also eternal. To this, if asked whether all words and sentences are eternal, the Mimamsa philosophers reply that the rules behind combination of phonemes are fixed and pre-determined for the Vedas, unlike other words and sentences. The Vedanta school also accepts this line of argument.

See also
Sruti
Acheiropoieta
Revelation
Shabda

References

Hindu philosophical concepts